Trevor (Trefor in the Welsh language) is a common given name or surname of Welsh origin. It is an habitational name, deriving from the Welsh tre(f), meaning "homestead", or "settlement" and fawr, meaning "large, big". The Cornish language equivalent is Trevorrow and is most associated with Ludgvan.

Trevor is also a reduced Anglicized form of the Gaelic Ó Treabhair (descendant of Treabhar), which may derive from the original Welsh name.

As a surname

People
Claire Trevor (1910–2000), American actress
Hugh Trevor (1903–1933), American actor
John Trevor (disambiguation), various people
William Trevor (1928–2016), Irish writer
William Spottiswoode Trevor (1831–1907), recipient of the Victoria Cross

Fictional characters
Steve Trevor, in the DC Comics, 1970s television series and 2017 film Wonder Woman

As a given name

People
Trevor Ariza (born 1985), American basketball player
Trevor Bailey, English cricketer
Trevor Bauer, American baseball player
Trevor Bayne, NASCAR Driver
Trevor Baylis (1937–2018), British inventor
Trevor Bayliss, Australian cricket coach
Trevor Berbick, boxer
Trevor Bigham, policeman
Trevor Bolder, British musician, bassist for Uriah Heep
Trevor Brooking, English footballer
Trevor Cahill, baseball player
Trevor Chappell, Australian cricketer
Trevor Chinn (born 1935), British businessman and philanthropist
Trevor Chinn (glaciologist) (c.1937–2018), New Zealand scientist
Trevor Christensen (born 1993), American DJ
Trevor Christie (born 1959), English footballer
Trevor Daley, hockey player
Trevor Daniel (American football) (born 1994), American football player
Trevor Daniel (singer) (born 1994), American singer
Trevor Dawson, arms manufacturer
Trevor Denbow (born 1998), American football player
Trevor Denman, Thoroughbred race track announcer, sportscaster
Trevor Devall, actor
Trevor Dunn, American bassist (Mr. Bungle) and composer
Trevor Engelson (born 1976), American film producer
Trevor Erhardt (born 1962), Canadian ice hockey player
Trevor Eve, actor
Trevor Foster, Welsh rugby footballer
Trevor Francis, English footballer
Trevor Gaskins, Panamaian basketball player
Trevor Gleeson, Australian basketball coach
Trevor Guthrie (born 1973), Canadian singer and songwriter
Trevor Haddon, British artist and illustrator
Trevor Henry, New Zealand judge
Trevor Hill, 1st Viscount Hillsborough
Trevor Hockey, Welsh footballer
Trevor Hoffman, baseball player
Trevor Horn, English musician
Trevor Howard, actor
Trevor Huddleston, Anglican priest and anti-apartheid activist
Trevor Hudgins (born 1999), American basketball player
Trevor Hurst, Canadian singer, vocalist for Econoline Crush
Trevor James (disambiguation), various people
Trevor Jones (disambiguation), various people
Trevor Keels (born 2003), American basketball player
Trevor Kidd, hockey player
Trevor Knight, American football player
Trevor Lane, American professional baseball player
Trevor Lawrence (born 1999), American football player
Sir Trevor Lawrence, 2nd Baronet
Trevor Letowski, hockey player
Trevor Oswin Lewis, 4th Baron Merthyr
Trevor Lewis, hockey player
Trevor Linden, hockey player
Trevor Lock, comedian
Trevor Lucas, spoken word artist
Trevor Mallard, New Zealand politician and Cabinet Minister
Trevor Manuel, South African politician and economist
Sir Trevor McDonald, broadcaster
Trevor Milton (born 1981/1982), American billionaire, CEO and co-founder of Nikola Motor Company
Trevor Moore (disambiguation), various people
Trevor Murdoch, wrestler
Trevor Neal, of British comedy duo Trevor and Simon
Trevor Nelson, British DJ
Trevor Noah, South African comedian and presenter
Sir Trevor Nunn, theatre and film director
Trevor Ogilvie-Grant, 4th Baron Strathspey (1879–1948), member of the House of Lords
Trevor Phillips (born 1953), British politician
Trevor Pinnock (born 1946), English conductor and harpsichordist
Trevor Plouffe, baseball player
Trevor Pryce (born 1975), American football player
Trevor Rabin, South African guitarist, rock group Yes
Trevor Read (born 1980), Canadian ice hockey defenceman
Trevor Rees-Jones (businessman), American billionaire
Trevor Rees-Jones (bodyguard), bodyguard and sole survivor of the car crash that killed Diana, Princess of Wales
Trevor Reilly (born 1988), American football player
Trevor Roach (born 1992), American football player
Trevor Robbins (born 1949), English neuroscientist
Trevor Roberts, 2nd Baron Clwyd
Trevor Rosenthal (born 1990), baseball player
Trevor St. John, American actor
Trevor Segstro (born 1978), Canadian ice hockey player
Trevor Semper, Montserratian cricketer
Trevor Siemian, American football player
Trevor Skeet, Conservative MP
Trevor Smith (disambiguation), various people
Trevor Soar (born 1956), retired Royal Navy admiral
Trevor Spring, gentleman cricketer and army officer
Trevor Stamp, 3rd Baron Stamp FRCPath
Trevor Stamp, 4th Baron Stamp FRCP
Trevor Steven, English footballer
Trevor Story, American baseball player
Trevor van Riemsdyk, American ice hockey player
Trevor Williams (disambiguation)
Trevor Wilson (basketball) (born 1968), American basketball player
K. Trevor Wilson (born 1981), Canadian comedian, writer, and actor
Trevor Wright, American actor
Trevor Żahra, Maltese novelist, poet and illustrator
Trevor Zegras, American ice hockey player

Fictional characters
Trevor the Traction Engine in The Railway Series children's books by the Rev. W. Awdry
Trevor, Neville Longbottom's pet toad in the Harry Potter series
Magical Trevor, a magician in Weebl's cartoons
Trevor Belmont in the Castlevania game series
Trevor Joseph Brennan/Bauer, main character in the Romantic Suspense series, Countermeasure
Trevor Evans, childhood/closest friend (at the beginning) of Mike Ross in U.S. TV series Suits
Trevor Fitzroy, supervillain in Marvel Comics
Trevor Goodchild, antagonist in the Æon Flux franchise
Trevor Hale, main character of the TV show Cupid played by Jeremy Piven
D.S. Trevor Hands in the British crime drama television series M.I.T.: Murder Investigation Team played by Michael McKell (2003, 2005)
Trevor Jordache in the Channel 4 soap opera Brookside
Trevor Langan, a recurring character and criminal defense attorney in the US TV series "Law and Order: Special Victims Unit" played by Peter Hermann
Trevor McKinney, a 12-year-old in the movie Pay It Forward played by Haley Joel Osment
Trevor Morgan in the BBC soap opera EastEnders
Trevor Ockmonick in the 80's TV show ALF
Trevor Philips is one of the three playable protagonists in the videogame Grand Theft Auto V by Rockstar Games
Trevor Reznik, main character of the movie The Machinist, played by Christian Bale
Trevor Slattery, a washed-up actor played by Ben Kingsley who portrays the fraudulent terrorist persona the Mandarin in Iron Man 3
Trevor Spacey, one of the playable characters in Metal Slug 4
Trevor's Treasure Tracker, strip cartoon about boy named Trevor in Whoopee! comics.
Trevor Troublemeyer, one of the main characters in the Canadian animated series Sidekick
Trev or Trevor, a series of minor characters created by New Zealand-Australian satirist John Clarke as part of his Fred Dagg persona

See also
List of Irish-language given names
List of Scottish Gaelic given names
Hugh Trevor-Roper, Lord Dacre (1914–2003), British historian
Horace Trevor-Cox (1908–2005), Conservative MP who later joined Labour

References

English masculine given names
Irish masculine given names
Masculine given names
Welsh masculine given names